The list of newspapers in Argentina records printed and online newspapers from Argentina.

The circulation of newspapers in Argentina peaked in 1983, with a sale of 1,420,417 copies overall. Two decades later it declined to 1,109,441 copies, and to 1,038,955 copies in 2012. Clarín remains the largest newspaper in Argentina, despite the fall in both total circulation and market share, which peaked at almost 500,000 copies and 35% of the Argentine newspaper market in 1983, respectively.

List
Key

See also
 List of magazines in Argentina
 Mass media in Argentina

References

Further reading

External links
 

 

 
 
 
 

Argentina, list of newspapers
 
Newspapers